Menuha, an Israeli moshav
 Menucha Publishers, an Orthodox Jewish publisher